North Bar may refer to:
 North Bar, a bar situated in Leeds, England
 North Bar (boundary stone), a boundary marker situated in Leeds, England (see http://openplaques.org/plaques/44017)
 Beverley North Bar, a gate in the historic town walls of Beverley, East Riding of Yorkshire, England
 North Bar (club), football club in the Philippines for which Ali Go played